The Women's Caucus for Art Lifetime Achievement Award was established under the presidency of Lee Ann Miller (1978–80). Joan Mondale, artist and wife of vice-president Walter Mondale, helped to secure approval for a national award honoring women's achievements in the arts, and Jimmy Carter presided over the first Women's Caucus for Art award ceremony in the Oval Office in 1980.  The WCA Honor Awards Ceremony has occurred annually most years since then.

See also

 List of media awards honoring women

References

Visual arts awards
Feminist art organizations in the United States
Awards established in 1979
1979 establishments in the United States
Mass media awards honoring women
Lifetime achievement awards